Mechanize is the seventh studio album by American heavy metal band Fear Factory. It is the only album to feature Gene Hoglan on drums and the first since 2001's Digimortal to include original guitarist and founding member Dino Cazares, who rejoined the band after a reconciliation with lead vocalist Burton C. Bell, in April 2009. The album was produced by Rhys Fulber, who had not produced or been involved with a Fear Factory album since Archetype. The album has received mostly positive reviews from fans and music critics, being praised for its very aggressive and heavy sound. In its first week of release, the album sold 10,000 copies.

Background

On April 7, 2009, vocalist Burton C. Bell and ex-guitarist Dino Cazares announced the reconciliation of their friendship, and the formation of a new project with Fear Factory bassist Byron Stroud and drummer Gene Hoglan of Strapping Young Lad. On April 28, this project was revealed to be a new version of Fear Factory that effectively excluded former members Raymond Herrera and Christian Olde Wolbers. Asked about the circumstances of their exclusion, Bell stated that "[Fear Factory]'s like a business and I'm just reorganizing... We won't talk about [their exclusion]."

In June 2009, Wolbers and Herrera finally spoke about the issue on the radio program "Speed Freaks." Herrera revealed that technically, he and Wolbers had not left the band: "[Christian and I] are actually still in Fear Factory...[Burton and Dino] decided to start a new band, and furthermore, they decided to call it Fear Factory. They never communicated with us about it,". Herrera went on to say that the original four members (Bell, Cazares, Wolbers, and himself) are contractually regarded as Fear Factory Incorporated, and said "it's almost like them two against us two, so it's kind of a stalemate." He also stated that he and Wolbers had written eight songs for the next Fear Factory record, but that a "personal disagreement" had come up between them and Bell, which left Bell unwilling to continue work with the band.

Despite issues between the two parties, Fear Factory moved ahead with the recording process. In late July 2009, a short video shot with a cell phone showed Dino recording over drum tracks with longtime contributor Rhys Fulber. On November 9, 2009, album artwork for the album was revealed on blabbermouth.net.

On February 2, 2010, the album's first official music video for the song "Fear Campaign" was released. The song also includes a standard guitar solo passage, something highly uncharacteristic of Fear Factory's usual standard.

The song Controlled Demolition contains a sample of the last words of Kevin Cosgrove, Vice President of the Aon Corporation, taken from a 9-1-1 call from his office in the Number 2 World Trade Center on September 11th, 2001.

The song "Final Exit" is a title borrowed from Derek Humphry's 1991 book of the same name, which deals with the topic of self-chosen euthanasia.

The bonus track "Crash Test" is a re-recorded version from their 1992 debut album Soul of a New Machine. The band also re-recorded versions of "Martyr" (also from Soul of a New Machine), which is found on the Japanese edition of the album and "Sangre de Niños", which has yet to be released.

Track listing

Charts

Personnel
 Burton C. Bell – lyrics, vocals ("Dry Lung Vocal Martyr")
 Dino Cazares – guitars ("Rhythms Of Mechanical Death"), bass ("Sonic Low End Pulsar Wave")
 Gene Hoglan – drums ("Continual Ammunition Barrage")
 Byron Stroud – bass
 Rhys Fulber – keyboards arrangements, piano (5), samples, programming ("Enhanced Soundscape Programming"), mixing, production
 John Sankey – drum programming (8)
 Mark Ferris – additional string arrangements (10)

References

Fear Factory albums
2010 albums
Candlelight Records albums
AFM Records albums
Albums produced by Rhys Fulber